Khwao Sinarin (also locally ) is a district (amphoe) of Surin province, northeastern Thailand.

History
The minor district (king amphoe) was established on 15 July 1996 with area split from Mueang Surin district.

On 15 May 2007, all 81 minor districts were upgraded to full districts. On 24 August the upgrade became official.

Geography
Neighboring districts are (from the north clockwise): Chom Phra, Sikhoraphum and Mueang Surin.

Administration
The district is divided into five sub-districts (tambons), which are further subdivided into 58 villages (mubans). There are no municipal (thesaban) areas. There are five tambon administrative organizations (TAO).

References

External links
amphoe.com

Khwao Sinarin